Isaac Jacob Weissberg (1841 – July 1904) was a Russian Hebrew writer and educator. He contributed articles to various Hebrew periodicals, including Ha-Melitz, Ha-Maggid, Ha-Tzfira, Ha-Shaḥar, Ha-Boker Or, Otzar ha-Sifrut, Aḥiasaf, Ha-Shiloaḥ, Ha-Goren, Ha-Pisgah, and Ha-Tikvah.

Biography
Weissberg was born in the town of Polonki, Minsk Governorate. He received his preliminary training in various ḥadarim, and then attended the yeshiva of Slonim, where he came to be regarded as one of the best Talmudic students. Later he went to Minsk, where he became acquainted with various Hebrew scholars of the Haskalah, especially with Joseph Brill (also known as Iyov of Minsk). While in Minsk, Weissberg devoted himself particularly to the study of Hebrew literature. In 1873 he established himself as a teacher of Hebrew in Kiev; many of his pupils became prominent Hebrew writers.

He made his literary debut in 1879 with the publication of a series of pedagogical articles in Ha-Melitz. His more important works include Ga'on ve-shibro, a scholarly criticism of medieval and modern literature; She'elat ha-nashim 'al pi ha-Talmud (also published in Yiddish), a work treating of the status of women according to the Talmud, as well as of the prevailing opinion regarding the authority of the Talmud; Peshuto shel Mikra 'al pi da'at (St. Petersburg, 1898), Talmudic explanations of Biblical passages; and Mishle kadmonim (Nezhin, 1901), a collection of ancient proverbs.

As a writer of the "old school," Weissberg defended the "purity" of the Hebrew language. He regarded negatively the desire of younger literati to broaden the language by the formation of new words and terms, and the influence of European literary movements in Hebrew literature.

He died in Kiev in July 1904.

Partial bibliography

 
 
 
 
 
 
 
 
 
 
 
 
  First published as

Notes

References
 

1841 births
1904 deaths
19th-century Belarusian writers
19th-century educators
19th-century Jewish biblical scholars
Belarusian educators
Belarusian Jews
Belarusian male writers
Educators from the Russian Empire
Jewish educators
Hebrew-language writers
Literary critics from the Russian Empire
People from Minsk Governorate
People of the Haskalah
Yiddish-language writers